Richard Palacios (born May 16, 1997) is an American professional baseball outfielder for the Cleveland Guardians of Major League Baseball (MLB). He made his MLB debut in 2022.

Amateur career
Palacios attended Berkeley Carroll School in New York City and played college baseball at Towson University. In 2017, he played collegiate summer baseball with the Bourne Braves of the Cape Cod Baseball League. He was drafted by the Cleveland Indians in the third round of the 2018 Major League Baseball draft.

Professional career
Palacios made his professional debut in 2018 with the Arizona League Indians, Mahoning Valley Scrappers and Lake County Captains, batting .361 with six home runs and thirty runs batted in over 45 games. He did not play in 2019 due to a torn labrum or in 2020 because the season was cancelled due to the COVID-19 pandemic. He started 2021 with the Akron RubberDucks before being promoted to the Columbus Clippers. Over 103 games between the two teams, he slashed .297/.404/.471 with seven home runs, 48 runs batted in, 33 doubles, and twenty stolen bases.

The newly-named Cleveland Guardians selected Palacios to their 40-man roster on November 19, 2021.

After beginning the 2022 season with the Triple-A Columbus Clippers, Palacios was recalled by the Guardians on April 25, 2022 and made his major league debut that same day, starting in left field. He collected his first career hit in the same game, a single off of Los Angeles Angels starter Michael Lorenzen.

Personal life
His brother, Josh Palacios, plays in MLB for the Washington Nationals and his uncle, Rey Palacios, previously played in MLB. Palacios' mother is from Curaçao, and thus he was eligible to play for the Netherlands national baseball team and was selected to play for them in the 2023 World Baseball Classic.

References

External links

1997 births
Living people
Sportspeople from Brooklyn
Baseball players from New York City
Baseball players from New York (state)
Major League Baseball infielders
Major League Baseball outfielders
Cleveland Guardians players
Towson Tigers baseball players
Bourne Braves players
Arizona League Indians players
Mahoning Valley Scrappers players
Lake County Captains players
Akron RubberDucks players
Columbus Clippers players
Scottsdale Scorpions players
American people of Curaçao descent
2023 World Baseball Classic players